Jai Singh II (3 November 1681 – 21 September 1743) popularly known as Sawai Raja Jai Singh was the 29th Kachwaha Rajput ruler of the Kingdom of Amber, who later founded the fortified city of Jaipur and made it his capital. He was born at Amber, the capital of the Kachwaha Rajputs. He became ruler of Amber at the age of 11 after the death of his father, Raja Bishan Singh on 31 December 1699.

Initially, Jai Singh served as a vassal of the Mughal Empire. He was given title of Sawai by the Mughal Emperor Aurangzeb before the siege of Khelna in Deccan. "Sawai" means one and a quarter times superior to his contemporaries. He received title of  Maharajah Sawai, Raj Rajeshwar, Shri Rajadhiraj in the year 1723, This was in addition to title of Saramad-i-Rajaha-i-Hind conferred on him on 21 April 1721

In the later part of his life, Jai Singh broke free from the Mughal hegemony, and to assert his sovereignty, performed the Ashvamedha sacrifice, an ancient rite that had been abandoned for several centuries. He moved his kingdom's capital from Amber to the newly-established city of Jaipur in 1727, and performed two Ashwamedha sacrifices, once in 1734, and again in 1741.

Jai Singh had a great interest in mathematics, architecture and astronomy. He commissioned the Jantar Mantar observatories at multiple places in India, including his capital Jaipur. He had Euclid's "Elements of Geometry" translated into Sanskrit.

The situation on his accession
When Jai Singh acceded to the ancestral throne at Amber, he had barely enough resources to pay for the support of 1000 cavalry.This abysmal situation had arisen during the previous 96 years, coinciding with the reign of the Mughal Emperor Aurangzeb. The Jaipur kings had always preferred diplomacy over arms in their dealings with the Mughals, since their kingdom was located so close to the Mughal power centers of Delhi and Agra.

Six months after his accession, Jai Singh was ordered by Aurangzeb to serve in the Deccan Wars. But there was a delay of about one year in his responding to the call. One of the reason for this was that he was ordered to recruit a large force, in excess of the contingent required by his mansab. He also had to conclude his marriage with the daughter of Udit Singh, the nephew of Raja Uttam Ram Gaur of Sheopur in March, 1701. Jai Singh reached Burhanpur on 3 August 1701 but he could not proceed further due to heavy rains. On 13 September 1701 an additional cut in his rank (by 500) and pay was made. His feat of arms at the siege of Khelna (1702) was rewarded by the mere restoration of his earlier rank and the title of Sawai (Sawai-meaning one and a quarter, i.e. more capable than one man). When Aurangzeb's grandson Bidar Bakht deputed Sawai Jai Singh to govern the province of Malwa (1704), Aurangzeb angrily revoked this appointment as jaiz nist (invalid).

Dealings with the later Mughals

The death of Aurangzeb (1707) at first only increased Jai Singh's troubles. His patrons Bidar Bakht and his father Azam were on the losing side in the Mughal war of succession. Sawai Jai Singh formed an alliance with the Rajput states of Mewar (matrimonially) and Marwar, which were done to form an alliance against Mughal Emperor Bahadur Shah I. Zulfiqar khan appointed Jai Singh to govern the important provinces of Agra and Malwa. In Agra he came into conflict with the sturdy Jat peasantry.

Jai Singh and the Marathas

The Kachwaha ruler was appointed to govern Malwa three times between 1714 and 1737. In Jai Singh's first viceroyalty (subahdar) of Malwa (1714–1717), isolated Maratha war-bands that entered the province from the south (Deccan) were constantly defeated and repulsed by Jai Singh.
In 1728, Peshwa Baji Rao defeated the Nizam of Hyderabad, part of the Mughal Deccan (treaty of Sheogaon, February 1728). With an agreement from Baji Rao to spare the Nizam's own domains, the Nizam allowed the Marathas a free passage through Berar and Khandesh, the gateway into Hindustan. The Marathas were then able to plant a permanent camp beyond the southern frontier of Malwa.  Following the victory of the Peshwa’s brother, Chimaji Appa, over the governor of Malwa Girdhar Bahadur on 29 November 1728, the Marathas were able to convulse much of the country beyond the Southern borders of the Narmada.

Upon Jai Singh's second appointment to Malwa (1729–1730), as a far-sighted statesmen, Jai Singh was able to perceive a complete change in the political situation, during the twelve years which had passed since his first viceroyalty there. Imperial power had by then been crippled by the rebellion of the Nizam of Hyderabad as well as the ability of Peshwa Baji Rao to stabilize the internal situation of the Marathas, which resulted in their occupation of Gujarat and an immense increase of their forces.
Nonetheless, in the name of the friendship between their royal ancestors, Jai Singh II, was able to appeal to Shahu to restore to the imperialist, the great fortress of Mandu which the Marathas had occupied a few weeks earlier (order date 19 March 1730). By May, Jai Singh was recalled back to Rajputana to attend more pressing matters, which thus resulted in his two years disassociation from Malwa.

In 1732, Jai Singh was for the last time, appointed Subahdar of Malwa (1732–1737), during which time he advocated Muhammad Shah, to compromise with the Marathas under Shahu, whom greatly remembered the kindness and relationship between the late Jai Singh I and his own grandfather, Shivaji.
For this sensible advice, coupled with anti-Jai Singh rhetoric at the Mughal court at Delhi, as well as Muhammad Shah's inability to assert his own will, Jai Singh was removed from his post while the Mughals decided on war.  In this regard, Jai Singh II was practically the last subahdar of Malwa, as Nizam-ul-Mulk Asaf Jah, who replaced him in 1737, met with most discomfiting failure at the hands of the Peshwa, resulting with the ceding of the whole of Malwa to the Marathas (Treaty of Duraha, Saturday 7 January 1738).

Exploiting the weakening of the Mughal state, the Persian raider Nadir Shah defeated the Mughals at Karnal (13 February 1739) and finally sacked Delhi (11 March, same year). Through this period of turmoil Jai Singh remained in his own state—but he was not idle. Foreseeing the troubled time ahead, Jai Singh II, initiated a program of extensive fortification within the thikanas under Jaipur, to this date, most of the later fortifications around the former Jaipur state, are attributed to the reign of Jai Singh II.

Jai Singh’s armed forces
Jai Singh increased the size of his ancestral kingdom by annexing lands from the Mughals and rebel chieftains—sometimes by paying money and sometimes through war. The most substantial acquisition was of Shekhawati, which also gave Jai Singh the most able recruits for his fast expanding army.

According to an estimate by Jadunath Sarkar; Jai Singh's regular army did not exceed 40,000 men, which would have cost about 60 lakhs a year, but his strength lay in the large number of artillery and copious supply of munitions which he was careful to maintain and his rule of arming his foot with matchlocks instead of the traditional Rajput sword and shield - He had the wisdom to recognize early the change which firearms had introduced in Indian warfare and to prepare for himself for the new war by raising the fire-power of his army to the maximum, he thus anticipated the success of later Indian rulers like Mirza Najaf Khan, Mahadji Sindhia and Tipu Sultan. Jai Singh's experimental weapon, the Jaivana which he created prior to the shift of his capital to Jaipur, remains the largest wheeled cannon in the world. In 1732, Jai Singh, as governor of Malwa undertook, to maintain 30,000 soldiers, in equal proportions of horsemen and foot-musketeers. These did not include his contingents in the Subahs of Agra and Ajmer and in his own dominions and fort garrisons.

Jai Singh's ambitions in Rajputana

The armed strength of Jai Singh had always made him, the most formidable ruler in Northern India and all the other Rajas looked up to him for protection and the promotion of their interests at the Imperial court. The fast-spreading Maratha dominion and their raids into the north had caused alarm among the Rajput chiefs—Jai Singh called a conference of Rajput rulers at Hurda (1734) to deal with this peril but nothing came of this meeting. In 1736 Peshwa Baji Rao imposed tribute on the Kingdom of Mewar. To thwart further Maratha domination Sawai Jai Singh planned a local hegemony, to form under the leadership of Jaipur, a political union in Rajputana. He first annexed Bundi and Rampura in the Malwa plateau, made a matrimonial alliance with Mewar, and intervened in the affairs of the Rathors of Bikaner and Jodhpur. These half-successful attempts only stiffened the backs of the other Rajput clans who turned to the very same Marathas for aid, and consequently hastened their domination over Rajasthan. Jai Singh's ambitions in Rajputana failed after the Battle of Gangwana.

Death and succession

Battle of Gangwana was the last destructive battle fought by Jai Singh as he could never recover from the shock and died two years later in 1743. Madho Singh later avenged his father by poisoning Bakht Singh of Marwar. (Jai Singh was cremated at the Royal Crematorium at Gaitore in the north of Jaipur) he was succeeded by his less capable son Ishwari Singh.

Contributions to society, culture, and science
Jai Singh was the first Hindu ruler in centuries to perform the ancient Vedic ceremonies like the Ashwamedha (1716) sacrifices — and the Vajapeya (1734) on both occasions vast amounts were distributed in charity. Being initiated in the Nimbarka Sampradaya of the Vaishnava sect, he also promoted Sanskrit learning and initiated reforms in Hindu society like the abolition of Sati and curbing the wasteful expenditures in Rajput weddings. It was at Jai Singh's insistence that the hated jaziya tax, imposed on the Hindu population by Aurangzeb (1679), was finally abolished by the Emperor Muhammad Shah in 1720. In 1728 Jai Singh prevailed on him to also withdraw the pilgrimage tax on Hindus at Gaya.

In 1719, he was witness to a noisy discussion in the court of Mughal Emperor Muhammad Shah. The heated debate regarded how to make astronomical calculations to determine an auspicious date when the emperor could start a journey. This discussion led Jai Singh to think that the nation needed to be educated on the subject of astronomy.  His interest may have been kindled as early as 1702 by his tutor Jagannatha Samrat. Despite local wars, foreign invasions, and consequent turmoil, Jai Singh found time and energy to build astronomical observatories.

Five observatories were built at Delhi, Mathura (in his Agra province), Benares, Ujjain (capital of his Malwa province), and his own capital of Jaipur. His astronomical observations were remarkably accurate. He drew up a set of tables, entitled Zij-i-Muhammadshahi, to enable people to make astronomical observations. He had Euclid's "Elements of Geometry" translated into Sanskrit as also several works on trigonometry, and Napier's work on the construction and use of logarithms. Relying primarily on Indian astronomy, these buildings were used to accurately predict eclipses and other astronomical events. The observational techniques and instruments used in his observatories were also superior to those used by the European Jesuit astronomers he invited to his observatories. Termed as the Jantar Mantar they consisted of the Ram Yantra (a cylindrical building with an open top and a pillar in its center), the Jai Prakash (a concave hemisphere), the Samrat Yantra (a huge equinoctial dial), the Digamsha Yantra (a pillar surrounded by two circular walls), and the Narivalaya Yantra (a cylindrical dial).

The Samrat Yantra is a huge sundial. It can be used to estimate the local time, to locate the Pole Star, and to measure the declination of celestial objects. The Rama Yantra can be used to measure the altitude and azimuth of celestial objects. The Shanku Yantra can be used to measure the latitude of the place.

Jai Singh's greatest achievement was the construction of Jaipur city (known originally as Jainagara (in Sanskrit, as the 'city of victory' and later as the 'pink city' by the British by the early 20th century), the planned city, later became the capital as the Indian state of Rajasthan. Construction of the new capital began as early as 1725 although it was in 1727 that the foundation stone was ceremonially laid, and by 1733 Jaipur officially replaced Amber as the capital of the Kachawahas. Built on the ancient Hindu grid pattern, found in the archaeological ruins of 3000 BCE, it was designed by Vidyadhar Bhattacharya who was educated in the ancient Sanskrit manuals (silpa-sutras) on city-planning and architecture. Merchants from all over India settled down in the relative safety of this rich city, protected by thick walls, and a garrison of 17,000 supported by adequate artillery. A Sanskrit epic by the name 'Ishvar Vilas Mahakavya' written by Kavikalanidhi Devarshi Shrikrishna Bhatt gives a good historical description of various important events of that era, including the construction of Jaipur city.

Jai Singh also translated works by people like John Napier. For these multiple achievements, Jai Singh II is remembered as the most enlightened king of 18th-century India even to this date. These days Jai Singh's observatories at Jaipur, Varanasi, and Ujjain are functional. Only the one at Delhi is not functional and the one at Mathura disappeared a long time ago.

See also
House of Kachwaha
List of Rajputs

References

Bibliography
Bhatnagar, V. S. (1974) Life and Times of Sawai Jai Singh, 1688-1743, Delhi: Impex India
Sarkar, Jadunath (1984, reprint 1994) A History of Jaipur, New Delhi: Orient Longman, 
Jyoti J. (2001) Royal Jaipur, Roli Books, 
Tillotson G, (2006) Jaipur Nama, Penguin books
Schwarz, Michiel (1980) Observatoria : De astronomische instrumenten van Maharaja Sawai Jai Singh II in New Delhi, Jaipur, Ujjain en Benares, Amsterdam: Westland/Utrecht Hypothekbank
Sharma, Virendra Nath (1995, revised edition 2016) Sawai Jai Singh and his Astronomy, Delhi: Motilal Barnasidass Publishers

External links

Genealogy of the rulers of Jaipur

1688 births
1743 deaths
Maharajas of Jaipur
Indian city founders
Subahdars of Malwa
Scientists from Rajasthan
18th-century Indian astronomers
18th-century Indian mathematicians
18th-century Indian monarchs
Scholars from Rajasthan